Bryan Richey (born April 1, 1980) is an American businessman, realtor, and politician from Tennessee. He currently serves as a member of the Tennessee House of Representatives, from Blount County's 20th district. A Republican, he assumed office on January 10, 2023.

Early life, education, and business 
Richey was born on April 1, 1980, in Winter Garden, Florida. He was raised in Apopka, Florida, where he graduated from Apopka High School, then onward to Lake Sumter State College in Leesburg, Florida. He later served in the United States Navy as an Mk-86 technician on the USS Gettysburg.

Political career

2020 election 
Richey ran for the Tennessee House of Representatives in 2020 but lost the Republican primary.

2022 election 
In 2022, he ran for a second time in the Republican primary and won 64.8% of the vote, defeating 14-year incumbent Bob Ramsey. He ran unopposed in the general election.

Tenure as state representative 
Richey assumed office as a member of the Tennessee House of Representatives on January 10, 2023.

Richey is a supporter of term limits in the Tennessee General Assembly. On January 11, 2023, he filed a bill (HB-118), which would require each Tennessee county to include a referendum on the ballot in the 2024 general elections, on the question of whether or not elected officials in counties and municipalities should only be allowed to serve a maximum of 16 years, whether or not it is consecutive. A week later, on January 19, 2023, he filed a constitutional amendment (HJR-45), which would create an amendment on the ballot in 2026, in similarity to HB-118, only for state elected officials, such as state representatives and senators.

Electoral history

Personal life 
Richey lives in Maryville, Tennessee. He is married with two children. He is a Baptist.

References 

1980 births
Living people
Republican Party members of the Tennessee House of Representatives
People from Winter Garden, Florida
United States Navy sailors